Matěj Štochl (born 4 May 1989) is a professional Czech football player.

References
Football

Matěj Štochl at ZeroZero

Czech footballers
1989 births
Living people
Czech First League players
1. FK Příbram players
FC Sellier & Bellot Vlašim players
Bohemians 1905 players
FK Viktoria Žižkov players
Association football forwards
People from Hořovice
Sportspeople from the Central Bohemian Region